Sunnyside is a historic mansion in Sevier Park, a public park in Nashville, Tennessee, USA.

History
The two-story mansion was built in the 1840s. It was designed in the Greek Revival architectural style. It was built for Mary Childress Benton, the sister-in-law of Senator Thomas Hart Benton, after she became a widow. When her great-niece Mary Douglass married Theodore Francis Sevier, it became their family home.

In the 1860s, the mansion was purchased by John Armstrong Shute, who gave it to his daughter, Mrs Stephen W. Childress, as a present. It was damaged during the Battle of Nashville. Shortly after, it served as a hospital for wounded soldiers of the Confederate States Army. After the war, Childress renamed the mansion Lee Monte, after Confederate General Robert E. Lee.

In 1882, the mansion was purchased by Dr. L.G. Noel, a Professor of Dentistry at Vanderbilt University. In 1927, Granville Sevier, who was Mary Douglass Sevier's grandson, bought back the home, adding to it and renovating it. His children bequeathed Sunnyside to the City of Nashville in 1945. Three years later, in 1948, Sevier Park was established as a public park around the property.

The mansion was restored in 2004.

Architectural significance
It has been listed on the National Register of Historic Places since October 1, 1974.

References

Houses on the National Register of Historic Places in Tennessee
Greek Revival houses in Tennessee
Houses completed in 1840
Houses in Nashville, Tennessee
National Register of Historic Places in Nashville, Tennessee